The 917th Aircraft Control and Warning Squadron is an inactive United States Air Force unit. It was last assigned to the Seattle Air Defense Sector, Air Defense Command, stationed at Puntzi Mountain Air Force Station, British Columbia. It was inactivated on 1 February 1963.

The unit was a General Surveillance Radar squadron providing for the air defense of North America.

Lineage
 Activated as 917th Aircraft Control and Warning Squadron, 16 April 1952 
 Discontinued, 1 February 1963

Assignments
 Western Air Defense Force, 16 April 1952
 25th Air Division, 1 January 1953
 Seattle Air Defense Sector, 1 March 1960 – 1 February 1963

Stations
 Geiger Field, Washington, 16 April 1952
 Puntzi Mountain AS, British Columbia, 8 November 1952 – 1 February 1963

References

  A Handbook of Aerospace Defense Organization 1946 - 1980,  by Lloyd H. Cornett and Mildred W. Johnson, Office of History, Aerospace Defense Center, Peterson Air Force Base, Colorado

External links

Radar squadrons of the United States Air Force
Aerospace Defense Command units